Matija Katanec (born 4 May 1990) is a Croatian footballer who plays for Romanian Liga II club Politehnica Iași mainly as a central defender.

Career 
Born in Varaždin, Katanec kicked off his career with local club Varteks and was promoted to the senior side in 2007. In July 2008, he was released by the club. After having represented Sesvete in the Croatian top tier, he moved abroad, signing for Slovenian club Gorica. On 1 November 2010, he returned to Varteks, renamed NK Varaždin a few months earlier, on loan.

On 3 February 2011, Katanec joined Austrian non league club Baumgarten. On 1 March 2013, he moved to Bosnian club Radnik after a stint with Gradina of the same country. After a single season with the club, he joined Zrinjski. He featured for the club in the UEFA Champions League qualifying round match against Slovenian club Maribor.

After having made 69 appearances for the Bosnian clubs, Katanec switched clubs and countries, signing for Italian Serie B club Spezia on 20 January 2015. However, he failed to make any appearance for the Italian side and hence subsequently joined Croatian second tier club Gorica in September till the end of the season.

On 29 December 2015, Katanec returned to Bosnian club Zrinjski, penning a deal which would keep him in the club till 1 July 2018. On 17 January 2018, he moved to Hungarian club Mezőkövesdi SE.

References

External links

1990 births
Sportspeople from Varaždin
Living people
Association football defenders
Croatian footballers
Croatia youth international footballers
NK Varaždin players
NK Croatia Sesvete players
ND Gorica players
OFK Gradina players
FK Radnik Bijeljina players
HŠK Zrinjski Mostar players
Spezia Calcio players
HNK Gorica players
Mezőkövesdi SE footballers
Zalaegerszegi TE players
NK Varaždin (2012) players
FC Politehnica Iași (2010) players
Croatian Football League players
Austrian Regionalliga players
Premier League of Bosnia and Herzegovina players
First Football League (Croatia) players
Nemzeti Bajnokság I players
Liga II players
Croatian expatriate footballers
Expatriate footballers in Slovenia
Croatian expatriate sportspeople in Slovenia
Expatriate footballers in Austria
Croatian expatriate sportspeople in Austria
Expatriate footballers in Bosnia and Herzegovina
Croatian expatriate sportspeople in Bosnia and Herzegovina
Expatriate footballers in Italy
Croatian expatriate sportspeople in Italy
Expatriate footballers in Hungary
Croatian expatriate sportspeople in Hungary
Expatriate footballers in Romania
Croatian expatriate sportspeople in Romania